The Riviera Hotel is a historic hotel building at 719 Central Avenue in Hot Springs, Arkansas.  It is a five-story brick-faced structure, its main facade divided into two sections flanking a central panel.  The outer sections are each topped by a rounded arch with carved foliate panels in the corner sections outside the arch.  Bands of windows are separated by horizontal panels at the lower levels, and it has a commercial storefront on the ground floor.  The building was designed by Charles L. Thompson and built about 1930.  It is a locally significant architectural work reminiscent of the Chicago school.

The building was listed on the National Register of Historic Places in 1982.

See also
National Register of Historic Places listings in Garland County, Arkansas

References

Hotel buildings on the National Register of Historic Places in Arkansas
Chicago school architecture in the United States
Hotel buildings completed in 1930
Buildings and structures in Hot Springs, Arkansas
National Register of Historic Places in Hot Springs, Arkansas
Hotels established in 1930
1930 establishments in Arkansas